Klaus Brunnstein (25 May 1937 – 19 May 2015) was a German politician of the Free Democratic Party (FDP) and former member of the German Bundestag.

Life 
Brunnstein was a member of the FDP until 1987. From 1980 to 1983 he was state chairman of the FDP in Hamburg, from 1981 to 1983 also a member of the FDP federal executive committee. Brunnstein was a member of the German Bundestag from February 1983, when he succeeded Helga Schuchardt, until the end of the parliamentary term in March of the same year.

Literature

References

1937 births
2015 deaths
Members of the Bundestag for Hamburg
Members of the Bundestag 1980–1983
Members of the Bundestag for the Free Democratic Party (Germany)